The 2009 Weber State Wildcats football team represented Weber State University for the 2009 season under head coach Ron McBride. The Wildcats finished the regular season with a record of 7–4 (6–2 Big Sky) and were invited to participate in the FCS Playoffs, where they fell in the first round to William & Mary by a final score of 0–38 to finish 7–5. The Wildcats played two FBS teams, and although they lost both games they lost each game by one touchdown (7 points) or less. Quarterback Cameron Higgins and wide receiver Tim Toone were both selected as FCS All-Americans (Toone on first team and Higgins on second team). 2009 also marked the first time in school history that Weber State qualified for the playoffs two consecutive years.

Schedule

References

Weber State
Weber State Wildcats football seasons
Weber State Wildcats football